Marcellus Vernon Wiley Sr. (born November 30, 1974) is an American sportscaster and former American football defensive end who played 10 seasons in the National Football League (NFL). He played for the Buffalo Bills, San Diego Chargers, Dallas Cowboys and Jacksonville Jaguars, making the Pro Bowl in 2001.

He currently hosts the More To It podcast, as part of the Dan Patrick Podcast Network. He formerly co-hosted SportsNation on ESPN, as well as an afternoon drive-time sports talk radio show on ESPN 710AM in Los Angeles, and Fox Sports 1's Speak For Yourself. Wiley also published a book Never Shut Up: The Life, Opinions, and Unexpected Adventures of an NFL Outlier in 2018.

Biography

Early life
At Saint Monica Catholic High School in Santa Monica, California, Wiley starred in both football and track and field. In football, he was an All-Conference pick. Wiley was a teammate of Adrian Klemm. He was his school's valedictorian and a member of the National Honor Society. In 1988, he was a national typewriting champion, with 82 words per minute.

College career
At Columbia University, Wiley played tailback, defensive end, and kick returner for the Lions. Starting as running back his freshman and sophomore years, he converted to defensive end in his senior season, recording 63 tackles (17 for loss), 6.5 sacks, eight pass breakups and three blocked field goals. As a team captain, he helped lead the team to an 8-2 season, the Lions' most wins since 1945. Wiley was a first-team All-American and All-Ivy League pick, and graduated from Columbia in 1997 with a degree in sociology.

Professional career

He was selected with the 52nd pick of the second round of the 1997 NFL Draft out of Columbia University by the Buffalo Bills.

Wiley started his professional career primarily as a situational pass rusher, recording nine sacks through his first three years. In 2000, Wiley underwent disc-repair surgery, missing the preseason. However, when Hall-of-Famer Bruce Smith left for the Washington Redskins, Wiley replaced him at defensive end for the Bills, making the opening day roster.

He was selected to the AFC Pro Bowl team in 2001 as a Charger.

NFL statistics

Post NFL career
Wiley was a cofounder of Prolebrity (a portmanteau of professional and celebrity), a sports community where pro athletes express viewpoints, publicize their businesses, charities and events, and connect with other athletes, fans and business opportunities.

Wiley worked for ESPN's NFL Live and was a substitute co-host for Mike and Mike in the Morning. He also co-hosted SportsNation. Wiley co-hosted Winners Bracket with Michelle Beadle from 2010 to 2012. Later, he co-hosted several renditions of LA's afternoon radio show including "Max and Marcellus," "Afternoons with MArcellus and Kelvin," and "Afternoons on ESPNLA with Marcellus Wiley and Travis Rogers" on ESPN LA from 2013-2018.

In January 2013, he became co-host of SportsNation on a full-time basis, taking over for Colin Cowherd.

On July 13, 2018 Wiley left his position at ESPN and joined FS1 as co-host of Speak for Yourself alongside Jason Whitlock, when Whitlock's contract was not renewed by Fox Sports in June 2020, Emmanuel Acho replaced Whitlock and joined Wiley as the new co-host. In July 2022 Wiley left Speak For Yourself as it’s host, for another role at FS1. 

In 2018, Wiley's book Never Shut Up: The Life, Opinions, and Unexpected Adventures of an NFL Outsider was released.

In 2022, Wiley began hosting the More To It podcast, as part of the Dan Patrick Podcast Network. His first guests were Lil' Wayne, Bruce Smith, and LaDainian Tomlinson. He is also hoping to start a new show on Fox in the future.

Millionaire Matchmaker
Wiley appeared on a November 2011 episode of Bravo's Millionaire Matchmaker. Season 5, Episode 12: "The Player and the Piano Player" ended when Wiley successfully found a romantic interest.

Personal life
Wiley has a daughter, Morocca Alise (born 1999), and a son, Marcellus Jr. (born 2015).

References

External links

Official website

1974 births
American Conference Pro Bowl players
American football defensive ends
American sports radio personalities
ArenaBowl broadcasters
Arena football announcers
Buffalo Bills players
Columbia Lions football players
Columbia College (New York) alumni
Dallas Cowboys players
Fox Sports 1 people
Jacksonville Jaguars players
Living people
National Football League announcers
Radio personalities from Los Angeles
San Diego Chargers players
Sportspeople from Compton, California
Players of American football from Compton, California